Mark Anthony Kinsella (born 12 August 1972) is an Irish football manager and former player, currently a coach at Drogheda United after previously being both the manager and assistant manager. He played as a central midfielder for most of his career.

Kinsella began his career at Colchester United, before spells at Charlton Athletic, Aston Villa, West Bromwich Albion, Walsall and Lewes. He played 48 times for the Republic of Ireland, scoring three goals and playing in the 2002 FIFA World Cup in Japan and South Korea. Kinsella is a former manager of Daventry Town.

Club career

Colchester United
Kinsella joined Colchester United as a 17-year-old (he was actually signed by the legendary ex-Rangers manager Jock Wallace) and played there for seven seasons, including two in the Conference, and played at Wembley in 1992 when Colchester won the FA Trophy. He was nicknamed "Sheedy" by the fans, in honour of the Everton player, and is among the club's most revered former players.

Charlton Athletic
Kinsella moved to Charlton Athletic in September 1996 for £150,000. At Charlton he captained the team to a dramatic victory over Sunderland in the 1998 Division 1 Play-off Final, with Kinsella scoring one of the penalties in the shootout. Following relegation after only one season in the Premier League in 1999, Kinsella lifted the First Division championship trophy with Charlton the following year, with the South East London outfit returning to the top-flight in 2000.

Kinsella is remembered by Charlton fans as a turning point in their recent history, he was the first player in the modern era to stay with Charlton when his performances placed him as a top ten midfielder in the country via the Carling Opta Stats. His skill, talent and sometimes individual carrying of the team in the 1998–99 season places him above that of Richard Rufus, Clive Mendonca, Andy Hunt and John Robinson in Charlton's list of greats in the late 1990s teams. In 2001, he suffered an injury, which allowed Scott Parker to take his place in the team. Kinsella could not reclaim his place in the Charlton first team after coming back from injury, so he was sold to Aston Villa in 2002, for a fee of £1 million.

Aston Villa
Kinsella made his debut for Aston Villa on 24 August 2002 against Tottenham Hotspur. He later went on to make 24 appearances in his first season. After a good start in the first half of the 2002–03 season he rarely made an appearance in the second half of the season and had a couple injuries that set him back. In Kinsella's second season he only made two appearances and left Aston Villa mid-season in early 2004.

West Bromwich Albion
Kinsella moved to West Bromwich Albion in January 2004, on a short-term contract until the end of the season. He made 18 appearances for the club, helping them to win promotion to the Premiership. His only goal for Albion came in a 3–0 win over Coventry City on 6 March 2004.

Walsall
Kinsella then transferred to Walsall in July 2004, signing a two-year deal. After two injury damaged seasons, Kinsella took charge of Walsall on a caretaker basis, following Kevan Broadhurst's sacking in April 2006, earning one win and suffering one defeat in his two games in charge. He continued to combine playing and coaching at Walsall before being lured back to Charlton in December 2006. His last professional match was in Walsall's League Two home defeat to promotion rivals Swindon Town on 9 December 2006. Kinsella scored two goals for Walsall, once against Merthyr Tydfil in the FA Cup, and once against Wycombe Wanderers in the league.

International career
Kinsella won 48 caps for the Irish national team, scoring 3 times and was named Irish Footballer of the Year in 2000. He also captained the side in a friendly against Finland in November 2000. Although rarely remembered, he formed an excellent midfield partnership with Roy Keane in the qualifying stages for the 2002 World Cup. Keane was quoted as stating that the Ireland's form during that campaign was down to the presence and performances of Kinsella. After Keane's much publicised dismissal from the squad before the 2002 World Cup, Kinsella formed a solid partnership with future Charlton player Matt Holland.

Managerial and coaching career
While still a player at Walsall, Kinsella took on the additional roles of reserve-team manager and first-team coach. He was appointed development coach at Charlton Athletic in December 2006, with responsibility for the development of young professional players, liaison with the academy and the managing the reserve team. After the appointment of Alan Pardew, Kinsella's role was changed to that of reserve-team manager. It was announced on 10 June 2008 that he has been given a new one-year contract at the club.

In November 2008 when Alan Pardew left Charlton by mutual consent, Kinsella left his post as Reserve team manager, being replaced by U18 Youth Coach Damian Matthew, to adopt a more senior role in the first team, helping Caretaker manager Phil Parkinson, while a replacement for Pardew was found. In December 2008, Parkinson was confirmed as the new Charlton manager, and Kinsella assumed the role of first-team coach permanently. He was sacked along with Phil Parkinson on 4 January 2011. He was linked with return to his former club Colchester United as manager in August 2009, but the job went to Adrian Boothroyd.

He became manager of Daventry Town in June 2011, leaving the club in July 2012. Having left Daventry, Kinsella joined former St Neots Town manager Dennis Greene's coaching staff at Conference North side Histon in August 2012.

Mark was appointed Colchester United assistant manager on 27 September 2012, to work alongside fellow Irishman Joe Dunne.

On 1 September 2014, Mark Kinsella was sacked as assistant manager of Colchester United.

On 29 November 2014, Kinsella was announced as assistant manager of League of Ireland side Drogheda United. Kinsella replaced Johnny McDonnell as manager following McDonnell's departure from the club after a 4–1 home defeat to bottom side Limerick.

On 10 November 2015, Drogheda appointed Pete Mahon as manager and Kinsella stepped back into a coaching role.

On 16 April 2016, the Football Association of Ireland announced that Kinsella, along with former internationals Damien Duff, Kenny Cunningham, Keith Andrews (footballer) and Stephen McPhail, would help coach some of the Republic of Ireland's youth players. Then on 31 August 2018 Kinsella moved to a specific role with the under-21s team.

Personal life
He is the father of Liam Kinsella and 2020 Olympic bronze medallist Alice Kinsella.

Career statistics

Club

International

Honours
Colchester United
Football Conference: 1991–92
FA Trophy: 1991–92

Charlton Athletic
Football League First Division: 1999–2000

Individual
FAI Senior International Player of the Year: 2000
PFA Team of the Year: 1995–96 Third Division, 1999–2000 First Division
Colchester United F.C. Player of the Year: 1993–94, 1995–96
Charlton Athletic Player of the Year: 1997–98, 1998–99

References

External links
 
 
 Aston Villa former players 

Republic of Ireland association footballers
Association football midfielders
Republic of Ireland international footballers
Republic of Ireland under-21 international footballers
Home Farm F.C. players
Colchester United F.C. players
Charlton Athletic F.C. players
Aston Villa F.C. players
West Bromwich Albion F.C. players
Walsall F.C. players
Premier League players
2002 FIFA World Cup players
Association footballers from Dublin (city)
1972 births
Living people
People educated at St Aidan's C.B.S.
Charlton Athletic F.C. non-playing staff
Colchester United F.C. non-playing staff
Association football coaches